Ciccolella or Cicolella is an Italian surname. Notable people with the surname include:

 Jude Ciccolella (born 1947), American actor
 Mike Ciccolella (born 1943), American footballer
 Justin Cicolella (born 1978), Australian footballer

Italian-language surnames